The barred spiny basslet (Belonepterygion fasciolatum) is a species of ray-finned fish in the family Plesiopidae, the longfins or roundheads. It occurs on reefs in the western Pacific Ocean from Japan south to Australia and east to New Caledonia. It is the only species in its genus.

References

Acanthoclininae
Fish described in 1889
Monotypic fish genera